Velagapudi is a village in Guntur district of the Indian state of Andhra Pradesh. It was a village in Thullur mandal of Guntur district, prior to its denotification as Gram Panchayat. Velagapudi is also the home to the temporary Secretariat of Andhra Pradesh.

History 
King Ganapati Deva of Kakatiya Dynasty, who ruled between 1199 AD and 1261 AD, had gifted the two villages of Velagapudi and Mandadam to Sivacharya, spiritual preceptor of Golaki Matham at Mandadam.

Demographics 
The literacy rate stands at 62.81 percent, with  literates.

Transport 

Velagapudi is located on the Vijayawada and Amaravathi route. APSRTC run buses provide transport services from Vijayawada and Guntur to Velagapudi.

References 

Neighbourhoods in Amaravati